Light the Fuse is a live album by the Rolling Stones, released in 2012. It was recorded at the Phoenix Concert Theatre in Toronto, Ontario, Canada. The album was released exclusively as a digital download through Google Music on 16 October 2012. The concert was performed in front of an audience of only 1,000.

Track listing

Personnel
The Rolling Stones
Mick Jagger – vocals, guitar
Keith Richards – guitar, vocals & lead vocal on track 9
Charlie Watts – drums
Ronnie Wood – guitar

Additional personnel
Bernard Fowler – backing vocals
Chuck Leavell – keyboards
Blondie Chaplin – backing vocals, acoustic guitar
Lisa Fischer – backing vocals
Kent Smith – trumpet
Tim Ries – saxophone
Michael Davis – trombone
Bobby Keys – saxophone
Darryl Jones – bass

References

The Rolling Stones live albums
2012 live albums